Barua (also spelt as Baruah, Barooah, Baruwa, Baroova, Barooa, Baroowa, Borooah, Boruah, or Baroa) is a common Assamese surname.

In Assam Valley

History 
During the Ahom reign, Barua represented by the Tai word Phu-ke(literally: "Leader of 10,000 men" in Ahom language), meant a superintending officer of the Paik system of the Ahom Army.

Appointments as Baruas were made irrespective of the paik's religion or ethnicity. Among other ethnic groups, there is mention of Sutiya Baruas in several instances of Buranjis. In Ahom Monarcy The Barua position was also given a position to the family of the Sutiya Kataki who later joined the Ahoms after the defeat of Sutiyas; Kachari, Sonowal and Thengal Baruas were of Kachari origin, while others like Bapu, Bez and Dewalia Baruas were Brahmins. Besides these, during the Moamoria rebellion, the Matak rebels also appointed Baruas among themselves.

Present

The rank being granted to various people within the Assamese community found its place among the Ahoms, the Brahmins, the Kacharis (Sonowals and Thengals), the Kalitas, the Koch, the Morans, the Motoks, besides the Sutiyas.

Baruas

 Amulya Barua (1922–1946): Pioneered modern Assamese poetry.
 Ananda Chandra Barua (1907–1983): Writer, poet, playwright, translator, journalist, an actor from Assam.
 Ananda Ram Baruah (1850–1889): Sanskrit scholar, sixth Indian Civil Service officer of India, and the first from Assam.
 Bhubanmohan Baruah (1914–1998): Novelist, short story writer from Assam. He wrote many novels under the pen-name of Kanchan Baruah.
 Binanda Chandra Barua (1901–1994): Noted Indian writer, poet of Assamese literature
 Birinchi Kumar Barua (1908–1964): Scholar, educationist, writer, historian, linguist, folklorist.

 Chandradhar Barua (1874–1961): Eminent writer, poet, dramatist and lyricist from Assam.
 Debo Prasad Barooah (1930–2013): Eminent intellectual, academician, author, historian and the former Vice-Chancellor (the Chief Executive) of Gauhati University.
 Dev Kant Baruah: President of the Indian National Congress at the time of Emergency (1975–1977).
 Gunabhiram Barua (1837–1894): An Assamese intellectual, ushered in new ideas about social reform in the early years of colonial rule in Assam.
 Hem Barua (Tyagbir) (1893–1945): Indian independence activist, social worker, writer from Sonitpur district of Assam.
 Hem Barua (1915–1977): Prominent poet, politician from Assam.
 Hemchandra Barua (1836–1897): Prominent writer, social reformer of Assamese of the 19th century.
 Jagannath Barooah: Tea-Planter, popularly known for Jagannath Barooah College.
 Jnanadabhiram Barua (1880–1955): Notable writer, dramatist, translator of Assam, and a participant in India's freedom struggle.
 Kanaklal Barua (1872–1940): Prominent writer (mainly in English language), essayist, historian, and politician from Assam.
 Kanaklata Barua: Indian freedom fighter from Assam.
 Lakshminath Bezbaroa (1868–1938): Assamese author, essayist, playwright, poet, and satirist.
 Navakanta Barua (1926–2002): Prominent Assamese novelist and poet.
 Padmanath Gohain Baruah (1871–1946): First president of Assam Rhetorical Congress, novelist, poet, dramatist, analyst, and a thought provoking writer.
 Pradan Baruah: Indian politician, former member of Assam Legislative assembly, member of parliament of Lakhimpur Lok Sabha.
 Rituparna Baruah, Indian politician
 Rudra Baruah (1926–1980): Actor, composer, lyricist, singer and musician.

 Jahnu Barua – Internationally acclaimed film-maker.
 Joi Barua – Singer, musician, and lead vocalist from Assam.
 Parvati Prasad Baruva: Famous Assamese music composer, poet, lyricist, dramatist: an icon of Assamese literature.
 Pramathesh Chandra Barua (1903–1951): Famous actor, director, and screenwriter of Indian films in the pre-independence era.
 Pratima Barua Pandey (1935–2002): Famous folk singer and daughter of Pramathesh Chandra Baruah.
 Radha Govinda Baruah (1900–1977): Founder of the Assam Tribune Group, sports enthusiast, introduced Assam to the culture of sports.
 Siva Prasad Barooah: Pioneer tea planter, path-breaker in Assamese journalism, renowned philanthropist, politician and humanist.

Notes

References

Other Links
 Barua (Bangladesh) people of Bangladesh are from the Buddhist stock. They spoke Pali initially and later shifted to Bengali. However, it is presumed that originally they were Assamese and later moved to Bengal and Bangladesh, and adapted their culture.

External links

Assamese-language surnames
Social groups of Assam
Ahom kingdom